Lara Stein (born November 28, 1966) Lara Stein is the founder and CEO of Boma Global. She is also the executive director (ED) of Women’s March Global, managing the Women's March movement and Chapters outside of the United States. Stein also acted as the interim executive director of MIT ReACT, a new institute-wide organization at MIT dedicated to developing a global educational platform for displaced populations and refugees. Ms. Stein was also the managing director (MD) of Singularity University’s global expansion and implementation strategy. Stein currently sits on the board of Equality Now and Lalela, a non-profit organization dedicated to education through the arts in South Africa.

Ms. Stein is the founder and former director of TEDx and of the TED Prize, having overseen the strategy, creation, development and implementation of the TEDx program at TED. TEDx is a program of local, self-organized events that bring people together to share a TED-like experience. TED is a nonprofit organization with the mission and slogan, "Ideas Worth Spreading", which was started as a four-day conference in California 30 years ago, by Richard Saul Wurman. Through Stein's leadership, TED expanded from two annual conferences, into a global community of 9,000 TEDx events in 1,200 cities of 133 countries. Most recently Lara was the MD of Global for Singularity University, driving global expansion and strategy.

Life
Stein was born on November 28, 1966 in Johannesburg, South Africa. She currently resides in New York City with her husband and their three children.

Career
Stein started her career at WGBH in Boston where she produced a national anthology of children’s animated half hours from around the world. Stein has held senior management positions at Microsoft’s MSN, Marvel Comics, Nelvana and iXL, a leading interactive and web development agency. As President of iXL’s eTV/Broadband unit, she oversaw production, new business development, acquisitions and management for all next generation platform projects. Prior to heading up iXL’s eTV/Broadband division, Stein founded and built iXL’s NY office, eventually managing a team of over 250 individuals. Stein also held senior positions at Microsoft’s MSN unit, ran its New York office, and spearheaded broadband programming and business development.

Throughout her career, Stein has produced and directed numerous documentary films and has consulted for media, art and technology companies, including, Pangea Day, Worldwide Biggies, Moveopolis, and JVP.

TED / TEDx

In 2009, TED hired Lara Stein to develop a program that granted licenses to third parties to organize independent TED-like events internationally. The global TEDx movement was conceived and created by Stein in the spirit of TED's mission, "ideas worth spreading." The program is designed to give communities, organizations and individuals the opportunity to stimulate dialogue through TED-like experiences at the local level. At TEDx events, a screening of TEDTalks videos—or a combination of live presenters and TEDTalks videos—sparks deep conversation and connections. TEDx events are fully planned and coordinated independently, on a community-by-community basis. TED grants licenses to third parties to host TEDx events in cities around the world. These one-time only licenses are free, but licensees must be approved by TED and must agree to adhere to a strict set of rules including format, duration of talks and events and number of attendees. Speakers are not paid and they must agree to give TED the right to edit and distribute their presentation.

As of the end of 2013 Stein had grown TEDx in to a global phenomenon, with more than 40,000 talks that having been given at more than 9,000 TEDx events in 1,200 cities across 133 countries.[49][50] Seven TEDx events on average were being organized every day in one of the 133 countries.

In 2011 Stein founded a program called "TEDx in a Box" that allows people in developing countries to hold TEDx events.

Under Stein's leadership TEDx has grown into a global community that includes TEDx corporate events,  TEDxChange and TEDxWomen. Stein also expanded TED talks to youth audience by launching the TEDxYouth platform, including an anchor event hosted by TED targeting Middle and High School students.

Recognition

Stein has earned recognition in several leading industry trade publications, including The Silicon Alley Reporter’s “Top 100 Executives”, Alley Cat News’ “Top Women of Silicon Alley” and The Elite’s “Who’s Who Among Outstanding Female Executives.”

References

External links
 Lara Stein TED Profile
 Wired
 "The Big McThink! How TED Became a Consumer Franchise", Wired 
 Global passion, local action - TEDx Video
 TEDx Story [Video]

TED (conference)
21st-century American businesspeople
1966 births
Living people